Short Circuit II is a concept album by the Japanese music production unit I've Sound, released on June 22, 2007. It is the second album in the Short Circuit series, centering on their denpa songs. The album is a compilation of songs from various adult PC games and three new originals. Kotoko and Kaori Utatsuki are the main vocalists of the album, although there is a duet between Kotoko and Eiko Shimamiya. It comes with a DVD containing a music video clip of the song "↑Seishun Rocket↑" covered by Kotoko and Utatsuki, who also appear in the music video. This version of the song was not included on the CD itself, but was later recorded on the I've Mania Tracks Vol.II album.

A talk event was held the following month to commemorate the release between July 14 to 16 at Osaka, Nagoya and Tokyo, followed by the Short Circuit II Premium Show in Tokyo concert held on July 21 at Shinkiba Studio Coast. A DVD recording of this concert was released at the Winter 2007 Comic Market event as a set with the I've Mania Tracks Vol.I album. On July 19, 2008, the Short Circuit II Premium Show in Taiwan concert was held at the National Taiwan University of Arts in Taiwan.

The album peaked at #25 on the Oricon Charts, charting for a total of five weeks.

Track listing

References

2007 compilation albums
I've Sound albums